HMS Fox Prize was a 24-gun French privateer, Le Behringhen taken by HMS Triton on 2 May 1705. She was purchased on 19 May 1705. She was commissioned into the Royal Navy in 1705 for service in Ireland. She was wrecked in Holyhead Bay in 1706.

Fox Prize (actually only listed as Fox) was the fifth named ship since it was used for a 22-gun French ship captured in 1650 and expended as a fireship at Malaga in 1656.

Specifications
She was captured on 2 May and purchased on 19 May 1705. Her tonnage calculation was 273 tons. Her armament was twenty 6-pounders on the upper deck with and four 4-pounders on the quarterdeck all on wooden trucks.

Commissioned Service
She was commissioned in 1705 under the command of Commander Henry Roach, RN for service in Ireland.

Disposition
She was wrecked in Holyhead Bay on 28 August 1706 with a great loss of life including her commander.

Citations

References
 Winfield, British Warships in the Age of Sail (1603 – 1714), by Rif Winfield, published by Seaforth Publishing, England © 2009, EPUB , Chapter 6, The Sixth Rates, Vessels acquired from 18 December 1688, Sixth Rates of 20 guns and up to 26 guns, Ex-French Prizes (1704–09), Fox Prize
 Colledge, Ships of the Royal Navy, by J.J. Colledge, revised and updated by Lt Cdr Ben Warlow and Steve Bush, published by Seaforth Publishing, Barnsley, Great Britain, © 2020, e  (EPUB), Section S (Fox)

 

1700s ships
Corvettes of the Royal Navy
Naval ships of the United Kingdom